Sadko was a Russian and Soviet icebreaker ship of 3,800 tonnes displacement. She was named after Sadko, a hero of a Russian bylina.

Ship history

She was built in Low Walker, England in 1912-13 as the icebreaking passenger and freight steamer Lintrose. Launched on 21 January 1913, the vessel was originally constructed for the Reid Newfoundland Company. She was enrolled to this owner on 14 March 1913 for ferry service in Newfoundland and was part of the Alphabet Fleet. In 1915 she was sold to the Imperial Russian Government's Ministry of Commerce and Industry for use as an icebreaker and cargo ship and renamed Sadko. On 20 June 1916, she sank in Kandalaksha Bay with a payload for the construction of the Kandalaksha–Murmansk railroad.

In 1932-33, Sadko was salvaged by the EPRON team led by Timofey Ivanovich Bobritsky, chief engineer. Refloated on 14 October 1933, she underwent repair and a complete refit at Arkhangelsk, emerging on 9 July 1934 on a trial voyage. Artur Karlovich Burke (1891-1942) was her captain. Burke also took Sadko on her first expedition to the Kara Sea, which lasted from 22 July to 25 September 1934, confirming the excellent work that had been done in restoring the ship to service. (For his work in ice navigation and scientific research, Burke received the Order of the Red Star (N 3902) on 27 June 1937. He died of tuberculosis at Solombala, Arkhangelsk, in November 1942.)

The next season, in 1935, she took part in an expedition led by Georgy Ushakov (1901-1963) with N.M. Nikolaev as captain of Sadko and Nikolay N. Zubov (1885-1960) as scientific director, engaging in deep-sea research and an attempt to reach Kvitøya in the Arctic Ocean.

In the summer of 1937, Sadko sailed from Murmansk with Nikolay Ivanovich Khramtsov as expedition leader, N.M. Nikolaev as captain of Sadko, and Vladimir Vize (1886-1954) as scientific director. Also taking part in this expedition was a Polikarpov U-2SP floatplane capable of landing on and taking off from the ice. The original goal was to sail to Henrietta, Zhokhov and Jeanette Islands in the De Long group, search for Sannikov Land and carry out scientific research. The purpose of the expedition was also to find out how the Northern Sea Route could be used for regular shipping. But the Soviet naval authorities changed the plans and the ice-breaker was sent instead to help ships in distress in the Kara and Laptev Seas.

Sadko, however, became itself trapped in fast ice at 75°17'N and 132°28'E in the region of the New Siberian Islands. Other two Soviet icebreakers, Sedov and Malygin, in the same area researching the ice conditions, became trapped by sea ice as well and drifted helplessly.

Owing to persistent bad weather conditions, part of the stranded crew members and some of the scientists could only be rescued in April 1938. They were evacuated using ANT-6-4M-34R Aviaarktika aircraft (a specialized Arctic variant of the Tupolev TB-3 four-engine bomber) under the command of the famed Soviet Arctic aviator Anatoly Dmitrievich Alekseev (1902-1974). It was only on 28 August 1938 that the icebreaker Yermak could free two of the three ships stuck at 83°4'N and 138°22'E, Sadko and Malygin. The third ship, Sedov, had to be left to drift in its icy prison and was transformed into a scientific Polar Station.

Sadko sank on 11 September 1941 in the Kara Sea after running aground on a submerged bank. Her crew were rescued by the icebreaker Lenin. Captain A.G. Korelsky was accused of sabotage and shot. Owing to the lack of information about the vessel's loss, as late as 1949 Sadko was still pictured and described in Jane's Fighting Ships.

Memory

An island in the Nordenskiöld Archipelago was named after Sadko. 

In 1977 a Soviet postage stamp honoring Sadko was issued, with the first day of issue postmarked at Moscow on 27 July 1977. 

A Russian postage stamp honoring Nikolay N. Zubov in 2010 included a portrait of Zubov with an illustration of Sadko at sea.

There is an excellent scale model of Sadko in the Museum of the Murmansk Shipping Company in Murmansk.

See also
 Professor Vize
 Konstantin Badygin
 Malygin (1912 icebreaker), originally Bruce, sister ship of Lintrose
 Fyodor Litke (1909 icebreaker), originally Earl Grey, another Canadian icebreaker purchased in 1915.

References

External links
 А. А. Киселев Работа ЭПРОНа по подъему судов в северных морях (Russian)
 К "белым пятнам" Арктики. История плаваний ледокольного парохода "САДКО" (Russian)
 "Садко", ледокольный пароход (Russian)
 S.S. Lintrose

Icebreakers of Russia
Icebreakers of the Soviet Union
Ships built on the River Tyne
Shipwrecks in the Kara Sea
White Sea
1913 ships
Maritime incidents in September 1941
Ships built by Swan Hunter